A pocket universe or bubble universe, also colloquially called pocket dimension, is a concept in inflationary theory, proposed by Alan Guth.

Description
It defines a realm like the one that contains the observable universe as only one of many inflationary zones.

Astrophysicist Jean-Luc Lehners, of the Princeton Center for Theoretical Science, has argued that an inflationary universe does produce pockets. In his 2012 journal, Lehners wrote about how pocket universes can emerge as a result of eternal inflation. The mechanisms of inflation within these pocket universes could function in a variety of manners, such as slow-roll inflation, undergoing cycles of cosmological evolution, or resembling of the Galilean genesis or other 'emergent' universe scenarios. Lehners goes on to discuss which one of these types of universes we live in, and how that is dependent on the measurement of the regulation of infinities inherent in eternal inflation.

But, Lehners continues, "the current leading measure proposals—namely, the global light-cone cutoff and its local counterpart, the causal diamond measure—as well as closely related proposals, all predict that we should live in a pocket universe that starts out with a small Hubble rate, thus favoring emergent and cyclic models." Lehners adds, "Pocket universes which undergo cycles are further preferred, because they produce habitable conditions repeatedly inside each pocket."

References

Inflation (cosmology)